This is a compilation of the results of the teams representing Italy at official international women's football competitions, that is the UEFA Women's Cup and its successor, the UEFA Women's Champions League. 

As of the 2016-17 season Italy stands 8th in the competition's association rankings and is thus granted two spots in the competition. Its major success to date is Verona's appearance in the 2007-08 semifinals.

Teams
These are the seven teams that have represented Italy in the UEFA Women's Cup and the UEFA Women's Champions League.

Qualification

1 Lazio qualified as national champions by beating Foroni Verona on penalties after drawing 2–2 in a single-match play-off.

Historical progression

Results by team

Brescia

Fiammamonza

Fiorentina

Foroni

Lazio

Tavagnacco

Torres

Verona

References

Women's football clubs in international competitions
Women